Steve Perlman may refer to:
 Steve Perlman (entrepreneur)
 Steve Perlman (botanist)

See also
 Steve Pearlman, Canadian television producer and director